The Episcopal Diocese of Honduras is an Anglican diocese in Honduras. It forms part of Province IX of the Episcopal Church. The third and current bishop is Lloyd Emmanuel Allen.

Bishops
 Hugo Pina-Lopez (1978-1980)
 Leo Frade (1984-2000) 
 Lloyd Emmanuel Allen (2001-Present)

External links
 Website of the Episcopal Diocese of Honduras

Honduras
Protestantism in Honduras
Province 9 of the Episcopal Church (United States)